The Buick Excelle GT is the name for the compact car manufactured by SAIC-GM under GM's Buick brand.

The original Buick Excelle was based on the Daewoo Lacetti developed by Daewoo Motors. Parallel to the Lacetti-based Excelle, Shanghai GM introduced a new car, also called "Buick Excelle" in China, but called "Ying Lang" in Chinese. It is based on GM's global compact car platform "Delta II" which was developed at Rüsselsheim in Opel's International Technical Development Center (ITDC). The globally sold Chevrolet Cruze as well as South Korean market Daewoo Lacetti Premiere were both based on this same Delta II platform.

Since the 2009 economic crises and the subsequent demise of the Saturn brand and reduction of GM's North American brands to four, certain Opel models were no longer aligned with the Saturn brand, but now with the Buick brand instead. Consequently, the models built and marketed by Buick China were twins of some Opel variants of GM's global platforms prior to the purchase of Opel and Vauxhall by Groupe PSA in 2017, while the Lacetti-based Excelle was re-positioned below Buick's newer offerings.

In China, a hatchback called the "Buick Excelle XT" debuted in 2009, which was essentially a rebadged Opel Astra J. A sedan debuted in 2010 called the "Buick Excelle GT".

A North American version of the Excelle GT was assembled in the United States from 2011 to 2016, and marketed as the Buick Verano.

In August 2016, Buick China decided to end 13 years of production of the original Buick Excelle (2003-2016) despite strong sales, with 2.68 million units sold over the course of 13 years. Citing its low price while the Buick brand was being moved upmarket in China as a main reason, there was no direct successor, with sister brands Chevrolet, Baojun and Wuling filling in the lower end market niche left unoccupied by the departure of the Buick Excelle.

First generation (2009)

Excelle XT (hatchback) 

The Excelle XT hatchback made its debut in late 2009 at the Guangzhou Auto Show and the Excelle GT sedan in June 2010. The hatch went on sale in China only in January 2010 and the sedan in June 2010. The XT is essentially a rebadged Opel Astra for the Chinese market only, with the most noticeable differences being Buick badges and a new grille.

Engine options for the Buick Excelle XT include:
 1.6-litre turbocharged four-cylinder gasoline engine that delivers 135 kW.
 1.6-litre inline four-cylinder gasoline engine with a two-stage variable intake manifold that delivers 85 kW.
 1.8-litre DOHC inline four-cylinder gasoline engine that delivers 103 kW.
All engines are available with a six-speed automatic transmission featuring a sport mode.

Excelle GT (sedan) 

Another version of the Opel Astra that shares the design cues of the Excelle GT is assembled and marketed in North America as the Buick Verano. Production of the Verano began in the fourth quarter of 2011 at the General Motors Orion Assembly plant. The Verano went on sale late in 2011 as a 2012 model.

Second generation (2015) 

A new Buick Excelle GT was introduced as a 2015 model. The new model has a completely new look, with new front and rear bumpers, new lights, new grille, and a more luxurious cabin. New engines included are a 1.4-liter turbocharged engine mated to a seven-speed dual-clutch transmission or a 1.5-liter  mated to a five speed manual or six-speed automatic transmission. Trim levels for this model are called 15N and 18T. Production of the new model began in March 2015.

2018 facelift 

In late 2017, Buick announced a facelift update for the 2018 model year that adds the new Buick grilles with the spreading wings to the Verano and Excelle products. The update applies to the Buick Verano sedan/hatchback, Buick Excelle GT sedan, and added a Buick Excelle GX station wagon as an additional new body style. 1 liter and 1.3 liter three cylinder engines were added to the range along with both 6 speed manual and dual clutch gearboxes.

References

External links
 

Front-wheel-drive vehicles
2010s cars
Sedans
Excelle GT
Cars of China
Cars introduced in 2009